Butovo:

 Butovo (area), an area with several settlements known since 16th and 17th centuries
 Butovo (railroad station), a station opened in 1865 of Moscow-Kursk Railway of Moscow Railway
  Butovo memorial complex
 Severnoye Butovo District
 Yuzhnoye Butovo District
 Butovskaya Line
 Butovo (village), several villages in  Moscow Region